Roccabianca is a comune (municipality) in the Province of Parma in the Italian region Emilia-Romagna, located about  northwest of Bologna and about  northwest of Parma.

Roccabianca borders the following municipalities: Motta Baluffi, Polesine Zibello, San Daniele Po, San Secondo Parmense, Sissa Trecasali, Soragna, Torricella del Pizzo.

It is home to the Castello di Roccabianca, a castle built by Pier Maria II de' Rossi between 1446 and 1463. It includes frescoes with Stories of Griselda (from Boccaccio's Decameron), by Niccolò da Varallo,  and astrological scenes.

References